The ASEAN Para Games is a biennial multi-sport event held after every Southeast Asian Games involving disabled athletes from the current 11 Southeast Asia countries. Participating athletes have a variety of disabilities ranging from spastic, cerebral palsy, mobility disabilities, visual disabilities, amputated to intellectual disabilities. The ASEAN Para Games is under the regulation of the ASEAN Para Sports Federation (APSF) with supervision by the International Paralympic Committee (IPC) and the Asian Paralympic Committee and is traditionally hosted by the country where the Southeast Asian Games took place.

History
In May 2000, delegates from the countries in Southeast Asia attending the Malaysian Paralympiad in Kuala Lumpur, Malaysia had a meeting and agreed to establish a disabled sport organisation. The ASEAN Para Games was conceptualised by Zainal Abu Zarin, the founding president of the Malaysian Paralympic Council. The proposed rationale was that a regional sports event will be held after the Southeast Asian Games and help promoting friendship and solidarity among persons with disabilities in the ASEAN region and rehabilitating and integrating persons with disability into mainstream society.

Ten countries, Brunei, Myanmar, Cambodia, Indonesia, Laos, Malaysia, Philippines, Singapore, Thailand and Vietnam were the founding members. These countries agreed to hold the Games biennially on 28 April 2001 and ASEAN Para Sports Federation (APSF) was formed on 23 October 2001 with Pisal Wattanawongkiri, president of the Paralympic Committee of Thailand who proposed the games' name, being elected as its first president.

The first ASEAN Para Games was held in Kuala Lumpur from 26 to 29 October 2001 comprising more than 700 athletes and officials from Brunei, Myanmar, Cambodia, Indonesia, Laos, Malaysia, Philippines, Singapore, Thailand and Vietnam participating in 2 sports.

At the 2nd ASEAN Para Games in Vietnam, East Timor was admitted into the federation as a provisional member.

Logo

The logo of the ASEAN Para Games depicting the ASEAN logo positioned in the center with the symbol of the 1994–2004 Paralympic logo on top and a victory laurel surrounding the ASEAN logo. It is used on all ASEAN Para Games edition logos since 2008. Previously, an unofficial symbol resembled the red colour version of the Southeast Asian Games Federation logo depicting the 11 red rings forming a circle was used on the logos of the 2003 ASEAN Para Games and 2005 ASEAN Para Games. Furthermore, the 1994–2004 Paralympic logo was used on the logo of the 2001 ASEAN Para Games.

Participating countries

List of ASEAN Para Games
Seven participating countries have hosted the ASEAN Para Games. Malaysia has hosted three Para Games (2001, 2009, 2017), more than any nation. The 5th ASEAN Para Games in 2009 were to be hosted by Laos, but it begged off from hosting the games due to financial difficulty and inexperience in providing necessary support for athletes with disabilities, therefore the games was brought back to Malaysia for the second time after eight years.

The 10th ASEAN Para Games scheduled to be hosted by the Philippines were canceled due to the COVID-19 pandemic. The edition numeral still applied despite the cancellation.

The 11th ASEAN Para Games scheduled to be hosted by the Vietnam was to be cancelled due to postponement for the 2021 Southeast Asian Games caused by COVID-19 pandemic. Horever Indonesia backed the Games and they were held in Surakarta between 30 July to 6 August.

Indonesia has hosted ASEAN Para Games twice (2011 and 2022). Philippines has hosted one (2005) Para Games, Vietnam (2003), Thailand (2008), Myanmar (2014) and Singapore (2015) had hosted their first ASEAN Para Games. Cambodia will host their first ASEAN Para Games in 2023, Laos will host the first time in 2027 and Brunei will host the first time in 2029. Also never hosted the Southeast Asian Games, East Timor have yet to host their first ASEAN Para Games.

 1East Timor was formally included in the Games, increasing its member countries to eleven.
 2Originally planned to be held in Laos.
 3Originally planned to be held in Hanoi, Vietnam.

List of sports
Nineteen different sports have been part of the ASEAN Para Games in one point or another. Sixteen of which comprised the schedule of the recent 2017 ASEAN Para Games in Kuala Lumpur. The games saw the return of sailing as a full medal sport once again after its debut at the 2009 ASEAN Games in Kuala Lumpur.
Core sports
  Athletics (2001, 2003, 2005, 2008, 2009, 2014, 2015, 2017, 2022)
  Powerlifting (2003, 2005, 2008, 2009, 2011, 2014, 2015, 2017, 2022)
  Judo (2005, 2008, 2022)
  Chess (2005, 2008, 2009, 2011, 2014, 2015, 2017, 2022)
Target sports
  Archery (2008, 2011, 2014, 2015, 2017, 2022)
  Cycling (2017)
  Target shooting (2008, 2015)
  Wheelchair fencing (2005, 2008)
Water sports
  Sailing (2009, 2015)
  Swimming (2001, 2003, 2005, 2008, 2009, 2011, 2014, 2015, 2017, 2022)
Ball and Racquet sports
  Badminton (2003, 2005, 2008, 2009, 2011, 2015, 2017, 2022)
  Boccia (2008, 2014, 2015, 2017, 2022)
  Ten-pin bowling (2009, 2011, 2015, 2017)
  Five-a-side football (2014, 2015, 2017)
  CP football (2014, 2015, 2017, 2022)
  Goalball (2005, 2008, 2011, 2014, 2015, 2017, 2022)
  Table tennis (2003, 2005, 2008, 2009, 2011, 2014, 2015, 2017, 2022)
  Wheelchair basketball (2005, 2008, 2009, 2015, 2017, 2022)
  Wheelchair tennis (2005, 2008, 2009, 2011, 2014, 2017, 2022)
  Sitting volleyball (2009, 2011, 2014, 2017, 2022)

 Boccia, ten-pin bowling, sailing and wheelchair fencing were demonstrated at the 2005 ASEAN Para Games.

All-time medal table
The table below accounts for the total number of medals awarded to all participating National Paralympic Committees (NPCs) of ASEAN member countries as of the recent 2022 ASEAN Para Games.

See also

 Events of the OCA (Continental)
 Asian Games
 Asian Winter Games
 Asian Youth Games
 Asian Beach Games
 Asian Indoor and Martial Arts Games
 Events of the OCA (Regional)
 East Asian Games
 Central Asian Games
 South Asian Games
 West Asian Games
 Southeast Asian Games

 East Timor at the Paralympics
 Events of the APC (Continental)
 Asian Para Games
 Asian Youth Para Games
 Events of the APC (Regional)
 ASEAN Para Games
 Events of the SEAGF
 Southeast Asian Games
 Events of the APSF
 ASEAN Para Games

References

External links
 ASEAN Para Games Website
 8th ASEAN PARA GAMES 2015 Singapore
 6th ASEAN PARA GAMES 2011 Solo - Jawa Tengah
 5th Asean Para Games official launch
 SEAGames website
 4th ASEAN ParaGames website
 ASEAN Para Sports Federation 
 Malaysia started the ASEAN Para Games 16 years ago. But guess who won every single year? :(

 
ASEAN sports events
Asian international sports competitions
Multi-sport events in Asia
Disabled multi-sport events